The Berința is a right tributary of the river Cavnic in Romania. It flows into the Cavnic at Copalnic-Deal.

References

Rivers of Romania
Rivers of Maramureș County